Gorman may refer to:

People 
 Gorman (surname) and list of people with the surname

Places

Canada
 Gorman, Edmonton, Alberta

United States
 Gorman, California
 Gorman, Maryland
 Gorman, North Carolina
 Gorman, South Dakota
 Gorman, Texas
 Gorman Township, Otter Tail County, Minnesota

Other 
 Bishop Gorman High School, private high school in Las Vegas, Nevada affiliated with the Roman Catholic Church
 Gorman, an Australian fashion label founded by Lisa Gorman
 Siebe Gorman, British commercial diving equipment company
C.N. Gorman Museum, art museum located in Davis, California

See also 
 Are You Dave Gorman?, British television show featuring Dave Gorman
 Wilson–Gorman Tariff Act, or the Revenue Act, 1894, reduced U.S. tariff rates from the 1890 McKinley tariff
 Justice Gorman (disambiguation)
 O'Gorman, a surname